Bukovac is a suburban settlement of the city of Novi Sad, Serbia. It is located in Petrovaradin municipality. The village has a Serb ethnic majority and its population is 3,936 (2011 census).

The name
The name Bukovac is thought to be derived from bukva ('beech'). The legend says that when the first settlers settled where now village's center is, there was an old beech  so they named the place Bukovac upon that tree.

Geography
The village is situated on the foothills of Fruška Gora mountain, and it is part of the metropolitan area of Novi Sad Around 9 kilometers from Novi Sad city center. Bukovački potok (Bukovac Stream) flows through Bukovac.

History, culture and education

Illyrian tumuli and necropolis have been unearthed in Bukovac, which was founded during the Ottoman rule in the 16th century by Serb settlers.

There is a Serbian Orthodox church of Vaznesenja dating from the 18th century. Ornamental and artistic work in the church is attributed to engraver Marko Vujatović, painters Stefan Gavrilović, Jakov Orfelin, Teodor Kračun and Dimitrije Bačević. There is one elementary school (grades 1-8) and kindergarten.

Demographics

Notable people
 Stjepan Đureković, Croatian businessman
 Boris Kovač, Serbian musician
 Milica Stojadinović-Srpkinja (1830–1878), Serbian writer and poet

See also
List of places in Serbia
List of cities, towns and villages in Vojvodina

References

 Slobodan Ćurčić, Broj stanovnika Vojvodine, Novi Sad, 1996.

Populated places established in the 16th century
Suburbs of Novi Sad
Populated places in Syrmia
South Bačka District